The 1976 Romika Cup, also known by as the Bavarian Tennis Championships, was a men's tennis tournament that was part of the Two Star category of the 1976 Grand Prix tennis circuit. The tournament was held at the MTTC Iphitos in Munich, West Germany and ran from  4 May through 9 May 1976. Manuel Orantes won the singles title.

Finals

Singles

 Manuel Orantes defeated  Karl Meiler 6–1, 6–4, 6–1
 It was Orantes's 4th title of the year and the 42nd of his career.

Doubles

 Juan Gisbert Sr. /  Manuel Orantes defeated  Jürgen Fassbender /  Hans-Jürgen Pohmann 1–6, 6–3, 6–2, 2–3 (Meiler and Pohmann retired)
 It was Gisbert Sr.'s 1st title of the year and the 1st of his career. It was Orantes's 3rd title of the year and the 41st of his career.

References

External links 
 ITF tournament edition details
 ATP tournament profile
 Official website

 
Bavarian International Tennis Championships
Romika Cup
Romika Cup
Romika Cup